Napa Kiatwanchai (born July 27, 1967) is the former Lineal and WBC strawweight champion from Nakorn Rachasima (Korat) province, Thailand.

Boxing career
He was born in a Thai-Chinese family in Thailand and turned professional in 1987. The next year he fought Hiroki Ioka for the Lineal and WBC strawweight titles. The bout ended in a draw and in the rematch Kiatwanchai won the title by a twelve-round majority decision. He defended the title twice before losing to Jum-Hwan Choi on November 12, 1989. He beat future champion Rolando Pascua before challenging for the WBC title again, on June 8, 1990. He lost to champion Hideyuki Ohashi by a twelve-round unanimous decision. His final try at the title came in 1992, when Humberto González knocked him out in defense of González's WBC light flyweight title.

Kiatwanchai stopped boxing in 1992 but made a comeback in 1996. He only won one fight during this comeback and retired for good in 2000.

Here are some facts before Napa's first title contending match with Ioka:-

Napa had only 6 professional fights, and never had an amateur fight before.
Napa was expected to extend the age of the champ Hiroki Ioka, so, he was sent to Japan with his trainer Kunoi Withichai only 2 people.
Napa was sent to canvas for an 8 count earlier, but after that kept opposing and hitting until half way of the 12 round when the champ Ioka was going to be Ko'd the bell suddenly rung so as to save the champ.
Before the fight with Ioka, Napa's boxing name was Chokchaichew Na Pattaya (his Muay Thai name), and the real Napa Kiatwanchai was actually another future IBF and WBC champion Muangchai Kittikasem, but Muangchai (or Napa at that time) was not ready to go, so, the manager put Chokchaichew in place of him, and since then he became Napa Kiatwanchai.

After  retirement his life has been difficult. He did not save any money because of lavish spending and gambling addiction. He now earns his living by singing along nightclub and restaurant. And he has problems with his vision, being blinded permanently as a result of the knocked by González in 1992.

See also
List of WBC world champions

References

External links
 
Napa Kiatwanchai - CBZ Profile

1967 births
Living people
World Boxing Council champions
Mini-flyweight boxers
World mini-flyweight boxing champions
Napa Kiatwanchai
Napa Kiatwanchai
Napa Kiatwanchai
Napa Kiatwanchai